The Live Ghost is a 1934 American comedy short film starring Laurel and Hardy, directed by Charles Rogers and produced by Hal Roach.

A copy of this film is held by the Library of Congress.

Plot
A gruff sea captain (Walter Long) enlists fish-shop employees Laurel and Hardy to help in shanghaiing men in a nearby bar to be a crew for his next voyage. They succeed in doing so by a stunt that gets each man to chase after Laurel, whereupon Hardy frying-pans the pursuing sailor and knocks him out. But they accidentally clobber the captain as well (but merely give him a slight headache rather than rending him unconscious, since he is so much bigger and tougher of stature than the wimpy sailors), provoking him into shanghaiing Stan and Ollie as well aboard what is rumored to be a "ghost ship" (which was why Captain Long was unable to get men to voluntarily enlist). He is so angry at this rumor that he makes a dire threat against the next man that so much as even utters the word "ghost" in his earshot: "I'll take his head and I'll twist it around so that when he's walkin' north he'll be lookin' south!"

When Captain Long gives his men shore leave, the boys opt to remain on board, fearing the men they shanghaied would seek revenge if they were not under the captain's jurisdiction. Preparing to head ashore himself, Captain Long asks The Boys to keep an eye on a drunken shipmate (Arthur Housman) and make sure he stays aboard ship. But he sneaks off anyway, and then while later staggering back to the ship in a state of liquor-hazed oblivion, falls into a tub of whitewash, then comes back onboard and crawls into his bunk to sleep it off.
Sometime later the boys accidentally discharge a pistol, and mistakenly believing that they've shot the passed-out sailor, they toss his sleeping body—still wrapped in his bedsheet, and thus they have not yet seen him in his whitened state—overboard, but he promptly wakes up and climbs back on board. When the duo next see him, they're convinced he's the ghost of the "dead" sailor and run around the deck shrieking in terror. Meanwhile, the shanghaied sailors have been plotting revenge against the duo for shanghaiing them and decide to sneak back aboard the ship to clobber The Boys during the captain's absence. When they get to the ship and see Laurel and Hardy running, they begin to pursue them—only to be stopped when they see what they're running from: the drunken sailor covered in whitewash, which they too mistake for a ghost and jump overboard shrieking in terror.

Captain Long returns with a barfly (Mae Busch) whom he has talked into joining him, only for her to recognize the whitewashed sailor as the husband who had deserted her years ago. She chases the drunken man off the ship with her furled umbrella. Irate and disappointed at this turn of events, Captain Long is further enraged by Laurel and Hardy when they both tell him that they saw a ghost. He thereupon carries out his threat: he twists their heads around so they will be facing backwards. Hardy wearily utters his "Another nice mess..." catchphrase; Stan performs his classic, "Oh, I couldn't help it" whimpers in reply.

Cast
 Stan Laurel as Stan
 Oliver Hardy as Ollie
 Walter Long as Captain
 Harry Bernard as Joe, the bartender 
 Arthur Housman as drunk "ghost" sailor
 John Power as sailor who says ship is "haunted"
 Charlie Hall as sailor at bar table
 Mae Busch as Maisie, the "floozie"
 Leo Willis as sailor in bar
 Art Rowlands as sailor with eye patch
 Dick Gilbert as sailor
 Hubert Diltz as sailor

References

External links
 
 
 

1934 films
1934 comedy films
1930s ghost films
American black-and-white films
American comedy short films
Films directed by Charley Rogers
American films about revenge
American ghost films
Laurel and Hardy (film series)
Metro-Goldwyn-Mayer short films
Seafaring films
1930s English-language films
1930s American films